Culture Shock is an English ska punk band formed in Warminster, Wiltshire in 1986 by Dick Lucas, previously of the Subhumans. Over their four-year history the band played hundreds of gigs, including frequent appearances at free festivals, and released three studio albums on the Bluurg record label. Lucas’ lyrics were mostly concerned with social and political issues, from cruelty to animals, Northern Ireland, war, and social alienation, but were far from angry rants, often finding a positive and empowering perspective. 

Culture Shock split at the end of 1989, as Bill and Nige both had young families to support. Dick went on to form Citizen Fish with Jasper, the bassist on Culture Shock’s final album, and two other former members of the Subhumans. Nige died in 1993.

Reformation
Interest in the band was revived by the release of the Everything CD retrospective in 2012; Culture Shock reformed as a gigging band and have been playing since 2013. The line-up remains the same except with Alex (from Citizen Fish) on guitar.

Members
 Dick Lucas (vocals)
 Bill (drums)
 Jasper (bass)
 Alex (guitar)

Previous members
 Paul Taylor (bass - on Go Wild, and Onwards & Upwards)
 Nige (guitar, vocals)

Discography

Albums
 1986 Go Wild (Fish 18)
 1988 Onwards & Upwards (Fish 20)
 1989 All The Time! (Fish 23)
 2016 Attention Span
 2018 The Humanity Show
2021  Mandemic

Cassette only
 "Living History" demo April 1986 (Bluurg Tapes 66)
 "Live At The Fish" (Earth Zone)
 "Reality Stop No.44" demo December 1986 (Bluurg Tapes 71)
 "Hot and Sweaty" live compilation (Bluurg Tapes 79)

Compilation
 Everything (Fish 51) (3CD/MP3, 2012)

Compilation appearances
 Crisis Point EP
 Stonehenge EP
 Open Mind Surgery LP
 Travellers Aid Trust 2LP & CD (Flicknife)

See also
 Punk ideology
 List of anarcho-punk bands

References

External links
 Bandcamp
 Official Subhumans and Citizen Fish site
 Discogs

English punk rock groups
Anarcho-punk groups
English indie rock groups
Musical groups established in 1986
Musical groups disestablished in 1989
People from Warminster
1986 establishments in England